Mokhtar Meherzi was the Algerian minister for transport in the 1992 government of Belaid Abdessalam.

References 

Possibly living people
Year of birth missing (living people)
Algerian politicians